Joris Harmsen (born 26 November 1992) is a Dutch male BMX rider, representing his nation at international competitions. He competed in the time trial event at the 2015 UCI BMX World Championships.

References

External links
 
 
 
 

1992 births
Living people
BMX riders
Dutch male cyclists
Olympic cyclists of the Netherlands
Cyclists at the 2020 Summer Olympics
Place of birth missing (living people)
21st-century Dutch people